Pygomeles petteri, also known commonly as Petter's short skink, is a species of lizard in the family Scincidae. The species is endemic to Madagascar.

Etymology
The specific name petteri, is in honor of French zoologist Francis Petter.

References

petteri
Reptiles of Madagascar
Reptiles described in 1962
Taxa named by Georges Pasteur